Volleyball Federation of Kosovo (Albanian: Federata e Volejebollit e Kosovës,  / Odbojkaški savez Kosova) is the governing body of volleyball in Kosovo).

History
Volleyball another sport that is played by hand, first appeared in Kosovo in 1936 in the high schools of cities like: Prishtinë, Pejë, Prizren etc. The first championship was held in Pristina on October 24 to 26 1948, six teams participated as: Proleteri, Buduçnosti, Trepça, Borac, Metohia, Brastvo. During 1966–1967, four teams from Kosovo took part in the second division of the league of Yugoslavia. In 1990 KV Prishtina-Elektroekonomia took part in qualification to enter the first division of Yugoslavia but did not succeed. First League of Women was organized in 1975. Universiteti from Prishtina was the first team of women who took part in the second division league of Yugoslavia. Now volleyball federation of Kosovo organizes competitions in the category of women and men. Major league called Superleague of Kosovo then come cup of Kosovo, the first league and junior's league.
Also part of the Volleyball Federation of Kosovo are competitions : Cup of Kosovo and beach volley.
Teams participating in Super league of Kosovo are: Theranda, KV Drenica, KV R&Rukolli, KV Besa, KV Luboteni, KV Ferizaji. The current champion is KV Luboteni.

See also
 Olympic Committee of Kosovo

External links
 Volleyball Federation of Kosova official web page

References

Sports governing bodies in Kosovo
Kosovo